The 2007 MLS Expansion Draft was held on November 21, 2007, and is a special draft for the Major League Soccer expansion team San Jose Earthquakes. They made 10 selections from a pool of players from current MLS clubs.

Format
 Only one player may be selected from each team, three of the league's 13 current teams will not have a player selected.
 Teams will be allowed to protect 11 players from their 28-man rosters. Generation adidas players are automatically protected, though players who are graduated from the program to the senior roster at the end of the 2007 season are not.
 Each team may only leave one senior international player unprotected. Players are considered SIs here based on their age for the 2008 season, not the 2007 season.

Expansion Draft

Team-by-team breakdown

Source

C.D. Chivas USA

Chicago Fire

Colorado Rapids

Columbus Crew

D.C. United

F.C. Dallas

Houston Dynamo

Kansas City Wizards

Los Angeles Galaxy

New England Revolution

New York Red Bulls

Real Salt Lake

Toronto FC

Major League Soccer Expansion Draft
2007 Major League Soccer season
MLS Expansion Draft